Fear, Emptiness, Despair is the fifth studio album by British grindcore band Napalm Death, released on 31 May 1994. Napalm Death's inclusion on the Mortal Kombat soundtrack brought significant exposure to the band and this album, alongside the fact that the band's label Earache had formed a partnership with Columbia Records which allowed the album to disseminate to a wider audience. RAW magazine listed Fear, Emptiness, Despair as one of the essential album of the 1990s.

In a 2017 interview, bassist Shane Embury listed the album as his least favourite of Napalm Death's discography, citing the division between the vocalist Barney Greenway and the remainder of the band, and the high corporate influence over the band during the album's production as factors that undermined the final result.

Musical style
Originally titled Under Rule, the album represented a stylistic transition for Napalm Death. Fear, Emptiness, Despair maintained the complex music structures of their previous albums Utopia Banished and Harmony Corruption, but there was a greater emphasis placed on incorporating elements of groove into the band's style, resulting in a wider use of mid-paced music. The group experimented a new compositional style: they started off with the drum beats and then layered the guitar riffs atop of the drum patterns Interview with Napalm Death. Bassist Shane Embury claims that Helmet and their album Strap It On influenced the band's style on this album. Other alternative rock groups that shaped Napalm Death's music during this transitional period were Soundgarden, Jane's Addiction and Sonic Youth, plus old favorites such as Discharge and Death.

Reception
In its first week of release Fear, Emptiness, Despair reached No. 22 in Billboard'''s Heatseekers chart. The inclusion of "Twist the Knife (Slowly)" in the Mortal Kombat soundtrack brought the band further acclaim. The soundtrack scored a Top 10 position on the Billboard 200 chart, and went platinum in less than a year. In the August 1995 edition of RAW Fear, Emptiness, Despair'' was featured in the magazine's 90 essential albums of the 1990s.

Track listing

Personnel

Napalm Death
Mark "Barney" Greenway – vocals
Jesse Pintado – lead guitar
Mitch Harris – rhythm guitar
Shane Embury – bass, random guitar noise
Danny Herrera – drums

Production personnel
Pete Coleman – production, engineering
Colin Richardson – remixing
Robin Grierson – photography
Graham Humphreys – design

Chart positions

References

Napalm Death albums
1994 albums
Earache Records albums